Caecilia degenerata, the Garagoa caecilian, is a species of caecilian in the family Caeciliidae. It is endemic to Colombia and known from the Cordillera Oriental in Boyacá, Santander, and Cundinamarca Departments.
Its natural habitats are montane forests. This subterranean species is apparently common in parts of its range. Deforestation might be a threat to it.

References

degenerata
Amphibians of the Andes
Amphibians of Colombia
Endemic fauna of Colombia
Altiplano Cundiboyacense
Taxa named by Emmett Reid Dunn
Amphibians described in 1942
Taxonomy articles created by Polbot